Hiliuți is a village in Rîșcani District, Moldova.

Notable people
 Alexandru Bantoș

Bibliography
 Furtună, Iacob, Satul Hiliuți, raionul Râșcani : În contextul istoriei Moldovei (Basarabiei) (1575-1998) București : Semne, 1998,

References

Villages of Rîșcani District